Mission Township is a township in Brown County, Kansas, USA.  As of the 2000 census, its population was 645.

Mission Township was formed in 1872.

Geography
It contains one incorporated settlement, Willis, and surrounds another, the governmentally independent city of Horton. According to the USGS, it contains four cemeteries: Carr, Claytonville, Kennekuk and Saint Peters.

The stream of Hazel Creek runs through this township.

Transportation
Mission Township contains one airport or landing strip, Horton Municipal Airport.

References

 USGS Geographic Names Information System (GNIS)

External links
 US-Counties.com
 City-Data.com

Townships in Brown County, Kansas
Townships in Kansas
1872 establishments in Kansas
Populated places established in 1872